Lake Sharpe is a large reservoir impounded by Big Bend Dam on the Missouri River in central South Dakota, United States. Lake Sharpe is the 54th largest reservoir in the United States. The lake starts near Ft. Thompson and stretches upstream to Oahe Dam, near Pierre. The lake is located within the following counties: Buffalo, Lyman, Hyde, Hughes, and Stanley.

Construction of Big Bend Dam began in 1959, and Lake Sharpe was named for Merrill Q. Sharpe, the 17th Governor of South Dakota.

Species of fish in the reservoir include walleye, sauger, smallmouth bass, channel catfish, flathead catfish, northern pike, white bass, yellow perch, black crappie, and rainbow trout. Walleye are the primary gamefish in the lake, and gizzard shad are the main food source for the walleye. Big game animals include whitetail and mule deer, elk, bison, coyotes and wild turkeys. Waterfowl and upland game birds include ducks, geese, pheasants, prairie chickens, and grouse.

There is over 80,000 acres of public land and water associated around Lake Sharpe. The South Dakota Department of Game, Fish, and Parks maintains several recreation areas and boat launching facilities around the lake. West Bend Recreation Area and Farm Island State Recreation Area are both located on the lake.

The U.S. Army Corps of Engineers maintains recreation areas and wildlife areas near Big Bend Dam, including Left Tailrace Campground.

Much of the western shore of the lake is within the Lower Brule Indian Reservation, while the Crow Creek Indian Reservation lies along the eastern shore. Both tribes lost extensive fertile bottomlands when the government acquired property that would be inundated by the manmade lake. This loss of agricultural lands adversely affected each of the tribes and the ability of their peoples to support themselves on the reservations.

See also
U.S. Army Corps of Engineers
Pick-Sloan Plan
Lake Oahe
Lake Francis Case
Lewis and Clark Lake
List of lakes in South Dakota

External links
U.S. Army Corps of Engineers - Big Bend Dam / Lake Sharpe
Lake Sharpe Recreation - recreation.gov, recreation information, camping reservations
South Dakota Department of Game, Fish and Parks
Left Tailrace Recreation Area (USACE)
West Bend Recreation Area (SD Game, Fish & Parks)
Farm Island Recreation Area (SD Game, Fish & Parks)
LaFramboise Island Nature Area (SD Game, Fish & Parks)

References

Sharpe
Sharpe
Protected areas of Buffalo County, South Dakota
Protected areas of Hughes County, South Dakota
Protected areas of Hyde County, South Dakota
Protected areas of Lyman County, South Dakota
Protected areas of Stanley County, South Dakota
Bodies of water of Buffalo County, South Dakota
Bodies of water of Hughes County, South Dakota
Bodies of water of Hyde County, South Dakota
Bodies of water of Lyman County, South Dakota
Bodies of water of Stanley County, South Dakota